Kerridge is a surname. Notable people with the name include:

 James Kerridge (1830–1911), British architect
 Edward Kerridge (fl. 1928), British cyclist
 Joe Kerridge (born 1992), American football fullback
 Linda Kerridge (born 1954), Australian actress and model
 Mary Kerridge (1914–1999), English actress and theatre director
 Phyllis Margaret Tookey Kerridge (1901–1940), British chemist and physiologist
 Robert James Kerridge (1901–1979), New Zealand businessman, cinema proprietor, film distributor, tourism promoter and entrepreneur
 Sam Kerridge (born 1993), Australian rules football player
 Tom Kerridge (born 1973), English Michelin starred chef

See also
 Beth Cullen-Kerridge (born 1970), English sculptor